Óscar Torres may refer to:

Óscar Torres (basketball) (born 1976), Venezuelan basketball player
Óscar Torres (Mexican footballer) (born 1995), Mexican footballer for C.F. Pachuca
Óscar Torres (Venezuelan footballer) (born 1959), Venezuelan former footballer

See also
Oscar Torre, actor